Public holidays in Malaysia are regulated at both federal and state levels, mainly based on a list of federal holidays observed nationwide plus a few additional holidays observed by each individual state and federal territory. The public holidays are a mix of secular holidays celebrating the nation and its history, and selected traditional holidays of the various ethnic and religious groups that make up the country.

The legislation governing public holidays in Malaysia includes the Holidays Act 1951 (Act 369) in Peninsular Malaysia and Labuan, the Holidays Ordinance (Sabah Cap. 56) in Sabah and the Public Holidays Ordinance (Sarawak Cap. 8) in Sarawak.

The workweek and weekend varies between states, with most states and federal territories observing a Saturday–Sunday weekend, while Johor, Kedah, Kelantan and Terengganu observe a Friday–Saturday weekend, though in Johor many private businesses and banks observe the Saturday–Sunday weekend due to close business ties with Singapore. In states and territories with a Saturday–Sunday weekend, a public holiday that falls on Sunday is substituted by a holiday on Monday, or the next working day if Monday itself is a public holiday. In Johor and Kedah, a public holiday that falls on Friday is replaced by Sunday or the next working day, while in Kelantan and Terengganu, a public holiday that falls on Saturday is replaced by Sunday or the next working day.

Overview

Federal holidays
Federal public holidays are fixed by the federal government and are observed nationwide with some exceptions. They are:
Prophet Muhammad's Birthday (Maulidur Rasul)
Hari Merdeka (National Day)
Chinese New Year (one day in Kelantan and Terengganu, two days in rest of the country)
Wesak Day
The Yang di-Pertuan Agong's (Official) Birthday (King's Birthday)
Hari Raya Puasa (Aidilfitri) (two days)
Hari Raya Qurban (Aidiladha) (two days in Kelantan and Terengganu, one day in rest of the country)
Deepavali (except Sarawak)
Christmas
Labour Day
Awal Muharram
Malaysia Day

Each state and federal territory observes 14 days of federal holidays, except Sarawak which observes 13 days.

Although the second day of Chinese New Year is not listed as a federal holiday in Kelantan and Terengganu, the holiday is gazetted as a state holiday in both states, effectively making it a nationwide holiday. Additionally, the second day of Hari Raya Qurban is gazetted as a state holiday in Kedah and Perlis.

State holidays
In addition to the federal public holidays, each state may gazette a number of state public holidays to be observed in the state. For the federal territories, the Prime Minister is in charge of designating the territorial public holidays to be observed in each federal territory.

In every state, the official birthday of the state ruler or governor is celebrated as a public holiday. In the federal territories, the Federal Territory Day is celebrated instead.

The most widespread state holiday is New Year's Day which is observed in eight states and all three federal territories, followed by Nuzul al-Quran in seven states and all three federal territories, and Thaipusam in five states and two federal territories.

As of 2020, each state and federal territory has designated four to six state public holidays, bringing the total number of (federal and state) public holidays to 20 days in Sabah and Terengganu, 19 days in Labuan, Penang and Sarawak and 18 days in the rest of the country.

Holidays by declaration
Section 8 of the Holidays Act 1951 gives the Prime Minister power to declare any day a public holiday in the whole of Peninsular Malaysia and Labuan, or in one of the federal territories, or in one of the states after consultation with the relevant state government. The declared holiday must be observed by all employers as a paid holiday.

Public holidays had been declared on the polling day for a general election, on the day of the installation of the Yang di-Pertuan Agong, as well as after international sporting events to celebrate the achievements of Malaysian athletes.

At the state level, the state government may declare an occasional holiday (cuti peristiwa) for events such as the installation of the state ruler, after major achievements in sporting events, or even to provide an extra holiday but unable to officially gazette it (such as the annual holiday declaration for Thaipusam in Kedah). Unlike holidays declared under Section 8 of the Holidays Act 1951, observance of occasional state holidays by private businesses and organizations is voluntary, while government offices and schools (except for nationwide exams) are closed.

In Sabah and Sarawak, the power to declare any day as a public holiday rests with the state governor (in practice, exercised on the advice of the state government) in accordance with the states' respective Holidays Ordinances.

List of public holidays by declaration under Section 8 of the Holidays Act 1951
The table below lists additional holidays that were declared under Section 8 of the Holidays Act 1951 for Peninsular Malaysia and Labuan. Unless otherwise noted, the same days were also declared as holidays by Sabah and Sarawak in accordance to their respective Holidays Ordinances.

Entitlement in employment law
In Peninsular Malaysia and Labuan, employees whose employment is covered by the Employment Act 1955 are entitled to 11 paid public holidays a year. Five of the holidays are fixed by law: National Day, Yang di-Pertuan Agong's Birthday, birthday of the ruler or governor of the state (Federal Territory Day in the federal territories) where the employee is contracted to work, Labour Day and Malaysia Day. The remaining six paid holidays are chosen by the employer from the gazetted public holidays, with notice provided to employees before the start of each calendar year. In addition, any public holiday declared under Section 8 of the Holidays Act 1951 is to be observed as a paid holiday.

Should an employee be required to work on a paid holiday, the employee may be given another day off, or compensated at two times their ordinary wages in addition to holiday pay. Overtime work done on a paid holiday is to be compensated at three times the hourly rate of pay (or three times the ordinary rate per piece for piece-rated employees).

Employment in Sabah and Sarawak is regulated by the Labour Ordinance of the respective states. Employees in Sabah are entitled to 14 paid public holidays a year while those in Sarawak are entitled to 16 days, with four fixed holidays on National Day, Yang di-Pertuan Agong's Birthday, the State Governor's Birthday and Labour Day. The provisions on compensation for work done on paid holidays are identical to the Employment Act 1955.

Table of public holidays 
All holidays are state/territorial public holidays unless otherwise indicated.

Types of holidays
Malaysia has one of the highest numbers of public holidays in the world, ranking number seven in the top ten countries after Thailand, Indonesia, India and Hong Kong. Some holidays are federally gazetted public holidays and some are public holidays observed by individual states. Other festivals are observed by particular ethnic or religion groups, but are not public holidays. The main holy days of each major religion are public holidays, taking place on either the western calendar or religious ones.

Secular
The most widespread holiday is the "Hari Kebangsaan" (National Day), otherwise known as "Hari Merdeka" (Independence Day) on 31 August commemorating the independence of the Federation of Malaya. This, as well as Labour Day (1 May), the King's birthday (9 September) and some other festivals are major national public holidays. Federal Territory day is celebrated in the three Federal territories. Malaysia Day, held on 16 September to commemorate the formation of Malaysia, became a nationwide holiday in 2010. Before that it was celebrated only in Sabah, Sarawak and Labuan. New Year's Day is also observed as a public holiday in all Malaysian states, except for Johor, Kedah, Kelantan, Perlis, and Terengganu.

Religious and ethnic
Muslim holidays are highly prominent in Malaysia. The most important of these is Hari Raya Puasa (also called Hari Raya Aidilfitri) which is the Malay translation of Eid al-Fitr. It is generally a festival honoured by the Muslims worldwide marking the end of Ramadan will the fasting month. In addition to Hari Raya Puasa, they also celebrate Hari Raya Aidiladha (also called Hari Raya Haji referring to its occurrence after the culmination of the annual Hajj or Hari Raya Qurban), Awal Muharram (Islamic New Year) and Maulidur Rasul (Birthday of Prophet Muhammad).

Malaysian Chinese typically hold the same festivals observed by Chinese around the world. Chinese New Year is the most prominent, lasting for 15-days and ending with Chap Goh Mei (十五暝). Other festivals celebrated by Chinese are the Qingming Festival, the Dragon Boat Festival and the Mid-Autumn Festival.

Malaysian Indians of the Hindu faith celebrate Deepavali, the festival of light, while Thaipusam is a celebration in which Hindu pilgrims from all over the country meet at the Batu Caves.  
The most important Sikh festival is the Sikh new year or Vaisakhi festival. Other important days are Lodi and Gurpurab. 
Other Indian and Indochinese communities observe their new year celebrations at around the same time, such as Pohela Boishakh of the Bengalis and Songkran (water festival) of the Thais. People in the northern states do celebrate the Thai festival of Loy Kratong.

Wesak (Malay for Vesak), the Buddhist festival commemorating Buddha's birth, is a public holiday. Malaysia's Christian community observes most of the holidays observed by Christians elsewhere, most notably Christmas and Easter. Good Friday, however, is only a public holiday in the two Bornean states. The harvest festivals of Gawai in Sarawak and Kaamatan in Sabah are also important for East Malaysians.

New Year's Day, Chinese New Year, and the start of the Islamic calendar are all public holidays.

Participation
Despite most of the festivals being identified with a particular ethnic or religious group, festivities are often participated in by all Malaysians. One example of this is the celebration of Kongsi Raya which is used when Hari Raya Puasa and Chinese New Year coincide. The term Kongsi Raya (which means "sharing the celebration" in Malay) was coined because of the similarity between the word kongsi and the Chinese New Year greeting of Gong xi fa cai. Similarly, the portmanteau Deepa Raya was coined when Hari Raya Puasa and Deepavali coincided.

A practice known as "open house" (rumah terbuka) is common during the festivities, especially during Hari Raya Aidilfitri, Deepavali, Chinese New Year and Christmas. Open house means that all well-wishers are received and that everyone regardless of background is invited to attend. Open houses are normally held at the home of the host and food are also prepared by the host, however, there are also open houses held at larger public venues especially when hosted by government agencies or corporations. Also during the festivities, most Malaysians would take the time off work or school to return to their hometowns to celebrate the festivities with their extended relatives. This practice is commonly known as balik kampung and usually causes traffic jams on most highways in the country.

Festivals of Malaysia

Muslim festivals

Buddhist festivals

Christian festivals

Indian festivals

Chinese festivals

Ethnic festivals

International and National Festivals

See also

 Public holidays of Sabah

References

External links
 Public Holidays in Malaysia 2018
 Public Holidays in Malaysia 2019

 
Malaysian culture
Malaysia
Holidays